

This is a list of the National Register of Historic Places listings in Palm Beach County, Florida.

This is intended to be a complete list of the properties and districts on the National Register of Historic Places in Palm Beach County, Florida, United States. The locations of National Register properties and districts for which the latitude and longitude coordinates are included below, may be seen in a map.

There are 73 properties and districts listed on the National Register in the county, including 2 National Historic Landmarks.  Another 5 properties were once listed on the Register but have been removed.

Current listings

|}

Former listings

|}

See also

 History of Palm Beach County, Florida
 List of National Historic Landmarks in Florida
 National Register of Historic Places listings in Florida

References

 
Palm Beach County